Line 19 (Sky Blue) is a planned line of the São Paulo Metro.

At  in length at its first phase, the line will be the first subway line to serve the municipality of Guarulhos, with Line 13-Jade of the commuter rail system already serving the city since 2018. Construction is expected to begin in 2023.

Background
Guarulhos is the second-largest city in the state of São Paulo, yet was not served by rail transport until the opening of the CPTM commuter rail's Line 13-Jade in 2018. Thus, planning for Line 19 began to link Guarulhos to the São Paulo Metro, along with Vila Medeiros and Vila Maria. It will be underground for its entire length.

Planning
São Paulo Metro originally planned to begin tendering for the construction of Line 19 in April 2020, but this was delayed to May.

Stations

References

São Paulo Metro
Proposed rail infrastructure in Brazil

pt:Metrô de São Paulo#Linhas em obras